The Supreme Court of the Australian Capital Territory is the highest court of the Australian Capital Territory (ACT). It has unlimited jurisdiction within the territory in civil matters and hears the most serious criminal matters.

The court has the jurisdictional power to hear matters that relate to the Jervis Bay Territory, the Australian Antarctic Territory and the Heard Island and McDonald Islands, although it has never heard a case exercising its power over the Heard and McDonald Islands. It also hears matters on appeal from the Magistrates Court of the Australian Capital Territory.

Whilst the Supreme Court is the highest Australian Capital Territory court in the Australian court hierarchy, an appeal by special leave can be made to the High Court of Australia. Matters of appeal can also be submitted to the ACT Court of Appeal, which is constituted by members of the Supreme Court.

The Supreme Court consists of 5 permanent judges, including the chief justice of the Australian Capital Territory (Lucy McCallum), 1 associate judge, 11 additional judges and 4 acting judges. The court has three main administrative units: Registry, Sheriff's Office and the Russell Fox Library.

The court is located on Knowles Place near London Circuit at Civic, in Canberra, in the new ACT Law Courts building that it shares with the Magistrates Court.

History
When the Federal Capital Territory was created in 1911, all existing laws applicable in New South Wales applied equally to the new Territory. The Commonwealth soon began the implementation of a series of ordinances for the Territory's governance.

In the early years, Territory justice was enacted through the provisions of the Seat of Government Acceptance Act 1909. Territory officials relied on the Queanbeyan, Goulburn and Cooma courts. On 12 December 1925, the Federal Capital Commission wrote to the Department of Home Affairs and Territories about developing a system for the administration of justice in the Territory. It would be another five years, however, before any decisive action was taken, with the establishment of a Court of Petty Sessions in 1930.

In November 1932, Cabinet considered a report dealing with contemporary arrangements involving Territory courts. The report noted the High Court and Court of Petty Sessions, and that there had been a recent trial use of a visiting judge to hear criminal and civil matters. What was needed, the report said, was for the Territory to have its own Supreme Court. This would relieve the High Court of its jurisdiction in respect of the Territory and provide an intermediate court of appeal between the High Court and Court of Petty Sessions. Cabinet approved the recommendation on 7 December 1932.

The first judge of the Supreme Court was Lionel Lukin, who served from 1934 to 1943, and the court's first sitting was on 12 February 1934 at Acton House (the building was demolished in 1940). The court moved to the Hotel Acton in early 1935, then to the new Patent Office in Barton in 1941, and then to the Law Courts Building on the western side of City Hill, on 8 May 1963.

Following the establishment of self-government in 1989, the court remained under Commonwealth administration until its transfer to the ACT Government on 1 July 1992, when the  came into effect.

By 2006, the Supreme Court comprised a Chief Justice, three resident judges and (since 1958) additional judges otherwise appointed to the Federal Court of Australia as well as a Master of the Court.

In 2015, the title of the office of Master of the Supreme Court was changed to Associate Judge.

It was announced in 2017 that the ACT Law Courts building would be expanded as the Supreme Court was experience capacity issues. In 2019, stage one of the renovations were completed. Not only did the renovations bring the Magistrates Court and the Supreme Court into the same building, it added several new courtrooms and modernised facilities. Stage two and the renovations of the original ACT Law Courts building is due to be completed in coming years.

Jurisdiction 
In addition to possessing jurisdictional power with respect to matters in the Australian Capital Territory, the Court also has the jurisdictional power to hear matters that relate to the Jervis Bay Territory, the Australian Antarctic Territory and the Heard Island and McDonald Islands, although it has never exercised that power. It also hears matters on appeal from the Magistrates Court of the Australian Capital Territory.

It is the Territory's superior court with civil, criminal and appellate jurisdiction. It also covers matters relating to corporation law, adoptions and probate. The court also conducted divorce proceedings, but only until 1975, when the Family Court of Australia assumed responsibility for this function.

Composition 
The court can be constituted by a single judge alone or with a jury. An appeal from the associate judge or from a single judge is heard by the court sitting as the ACT Court of Appeal constituted by three judges. An appeal from the Magistrates Court of the Australian Capital Territory is heard by a single judge.

Permanent judges are appointed by the executive. Additional judges are judges of other superior Australian courts (usually the Federal Court of Australia) that have been appointed as an additional judge of the Supreme Court. Acting judges are judges who have a short term appointment of up to 12 months by the executive.

The executive must also appoint a Chief Justice. The Chief Justice is responsible for the prompt discharge of the court’s business, and may, in consultation with a judge, decide the types of cases which a magistrate will hear.

Membership

Chief Justice

Judges

Associate Judge

Additional Judges

Acting Judges

Process

Civil matters may be commenced by the filing of an originating application or originating process.

Criminal matters are commenced when they persons are committed to trial or sentence by the Magistrates Court of the Australian Capital Territory.

Appeals to the court may come from several sources including the Magistrates Court and the ACT Civil and Administrative Tribunal.

See also

 List of Judges of the Supreme Court of the Australian Capital Territory

References

 
Buildings and structures in Canberra
1934 establishments in Australia
Courts and tribunals established in 1934